Francis Call Woodman (1864-1959) was an American teacher and educational administrator. Woodman co-founded the Morristown School (now the Morristown-Beard School) in Morristown, New Jersey with former Harvard University classmates Thomas Quincy Brown, Jr. and Arthur Pierce Butler. Woodman then served as the school's first headmaster during its first 19 years (1898-1917). During World War I, he served as an educational advisor for the YMCA in France. Woodman later worked as an independent education consultant.

Early life and education

Woodman was born on June 13, 1864. He grew up in Jamaica Plain, a historic neighborhood of Boston, Massachusetts, and he graduated from Roxbury Latin School. Woodman then completed his undergraduate studies at Harvard University in 1888.

During his studies at Harvard, Woodman played the positions of left tackle and placekicker for the Harvard Crimson football team with the nickname of "Jumbo". He competed against football teams from Princeton University whose players included William Irvine, the founder and first Headmaster at Mercersburg Academy in Mercersburg, Pennsylvania. In an exhibition game played against Phillips Exeter Academy, Woodman successfully kicked 20 field goals. The game had a final score of 154-0. Woodman also played on Harvard's crew team alongside Charles Francis Adams III, the Secretary of the Navy during the Hoover Presidential Administration. After Woodman fell ill in 1948, four Harvard football players from the 1947 team, including the team captain, donated blood to assist his recovery.

Publishing work

Following graduation from college, Woodman joined the publishing firm  Longmans, Green, & Co. (now an imprint of Pearson PLC). He served as head of the educational department at their New York City office for seven years.

Family

Woodman married Melanie Martha Muller in Newburyport, Massachusetts on June 29, 1943. At the time, Muller served as the head of the Art Department at Colby College in Waterville, Maine.

References

Schoolteachers from New Jersey
Harvard Crimson football players
Harvard University alumni
Players of American football from Boston
1864 births
1959 deaths
Roxbury Latin School alumni
People from Jamaica Plain